Jim Annunziato is a Grammy Award winning American recording engineer.

Career
Annunziato has worked with many mainstream artists including Jennifer Lopez, Marc Anthony, Celine Dion, Brie Larson, Jessica Simpson and Lionel Richie.  He has also been credited as Pro tools engineer on the Oscar winning Miramax movie, Chicago with Catherine Zeta-Jones and Richard Gere.

Awards and nominations
At the 14th Annual Latin Grammy Awards in 2013, Jim was awarded a Latin Grammy for Record of the Year for his engineer work on the Marc Anthony hit single, Vivir Mi Vida. The following year, at the 2014 Latin Grammy Awards, Jim was nominated in the category of Record of the Year for Marc Anthony's Cambio De Piel, and Album of the Year for Marc Anthony’s 3.0.

Discography
1999
Rosie O’Donell A Rosie Christmas - Engineer
Diana Ross “Everyday is a New Day" - Assistant Engineer

2000
Son by Four A Puro Dolor - Engineer
Anastacia Not That Kind - Digital editor
Lucero “Mi Destino” - Engineer
Coco Lee Just No Other Way  - Engineer
Rosie O'Donell Another Rosie Christmas  Engineer

2001
Ginuwine "Just Because" (single) - Engineer
Ginuwine The Life - Mixing
Jennifer Lopez "Love Don’t Cost a Thing" - Mixing Assistant
Jennifer Lopez  J.Lo - Mixing Assistant
Anastacia Freak of Nature - Engineer

2002
VH1 Divas: 2002 - Engineer
Marc Anthony Mended - Mixing
Chicago [The Miramax Motion Picture Soundtrack] - Digital editing, mixing assistant
Celine Dion A New Day Has Come - Engineer
Kelly Osbourne "Changes" - Engineer
Enrique Escape - Engineer

2003
Lionel Richie The Definitive Collection - Engineer
Celine Dion One Heart - Mixing assistant
Jessica Simpson In This Skin - Assistant engineer
Thalia "Baby, I'm in Love" Thalia (Virgin Records/ EMI Latin) — Engineer

2004
Lionel Richie Encore - Engineer
“Ella Enchanted” [Original Soundtrack] - Mixing assistant

2005
Jennifer Lopez Rebirth - Assistant engineer
Anastacia Pieces of a Dream - Engineer, mixing
Brie Larson Finally Out of P.E. - Engineer
Hed Kandi: Winter Chill 06.04 - Vocal engineer
Bride & Prejudice - Vocal engineer

2006
David Bisbal Premonición - Engineer
Don Dinero El Ultimo Guerrero - Engineer

2007
Jennifer Lopez Brave - Engineer

2011
Jennifer Lopez Love? - Vocal Engineer

2013
Marc Anthony 3.0 - Vocal engineer

2016
Jordan White High Road'' (Pangea Recordings) - Producer

References

External links

1974 births
Living people
American audio engineers
Grammy Award winners